The Lightstone Group is a privately held real estate investment company which owns and operates a diversified portfolio of multifamily, office, industrial, hotel, and retail properties. Lightstone has invested directly in individual real estate assets and in real estate operating companies. The company was founded by David Lichtenstein in 1988.

The company's portfolio of real estate properties spans 20 U.S. states, and includes more than 11,000 multifamily units and approximately 20 million square feet of commercial space in the office, industrial, hotel, and retail sectors. The company has more than 450 employees, and is headquartered in New York City with regional offices in New Jersey, Maryland, and Illinois. Beacon Management is a Lightstone subsidiary, which manages the company's residential apartment business. Baltimore, Maryland-based Paragon Outlets is an affiliate of Lightstone, and manages the company's retail portfolio.

Lightstone REITs
In 2006, the company offered a $300 million real estate investment trust, which allowed Lightstone to raise money from outside investors for the first time. The non-traded Lightstone Value Plus REIT invested in office, retail, and other commercial properties, and by the end of 2009, was fully invested in a total of 30 properties. By the end of 2011, Lightstone Value Plus I was the 18th largest non-traded U.S. REIT.

In the summer of 2010, the company offered second, non-traded REIT, Lightstone Value Plus II, committing capital to the hospitality, retail, multi-family, and commercial segments. The Lightstone Group committed 10% of the capital raised by the REIT. By December 2011, LVPII had invested in several properties, including the Crowne Plaza Boston hotel, Saxon Hall Rego Park, and TownePlace Metairie hotel in New Orleans.

Extended Stay Hotels
The Lightstone Group acquired Extended Stay Hotels (now trading as Extended Stay America) in June 2007 from The Blackstone Group for US$8 billion. The deal, financed with US$7 billion of debt, was one of several multibillion-dollar hotel and casino sales made that year. On June 15, 2009, Extended Stay America filed for bankruptcy protection under Chapter 11. After the Great Recession decimated leisure and business travel, Extended Stay faced shortages in liquidity stemming from the leveraged buyout by Lightstone two years before. Through debtor-in-possession financing, it was able to continue operating rather than to face liquidation.

In July 2010, an investment consortium made up of Blackstone, Paulson & Co., and Centerbridge Partners bought Extended Stay America through a bankruptcy auction for US$3.93 billion. After its successful reorganization, Extended Stay America emerged from bankruptcy in October 2010. A year after the bankruptcy, Blackstone was sued by creditors of Extended Stay America alleging that Blackstone "skimmed" US$2.1 billion off of the sale to Lightstone and knew that the amount of debt would have been unsustainable for the hotel chain; Blackstone settled the lawsuit in June 2013 for US$10 million.

Affordable hotel investment 
In 2019, The Lightstone Group, a real estate investment management business, is gambling on inexpensive New York City hotel developments. The company has launched a Moxy Hotels catering chain to the business sliver and will operate two more shortly, the Moxy Lower East Side and Moxy Williamsburg.

References

External links
 Official Website

Real estate companies of the United States
1988 establishments in New York (state)
1988 establishments in the United States
Real estate companies established in 1988
Companies established in 1988